Albert McTaggart "Ab" Campbell (1910–1973) was a Canadian politician and the Chairman of Metropolitan Toronto from 1969 to 1973.

Background
Campbell was born on a family farm in Ridgetown, Ontario, in 1910 to John M. Campbell and Isabella McTaggart. He attended the Ontario Agricultural College at Guelph and graduated with a B.S.C. from the University of Toronto in 1933.  After leaving the family farm he was, for almost 15 years, a secondary school teacher teaching chemistry, physics and math. In 1944, he moved to Scarborough to settle on his wife's family farm (Helen E. Huber) which they inherited after her uncle's death, James G. Cornell, the same year. Campbell kept the  family farm on Lot 18, Concession C, bound by Eglinton Avenue, Kingston Road and Markham Road, until the end of his life despite the transformation of Scarborough from a semi-rural community to a metropolitan suburb.

Politics
Campbell's political career began as a Scarborough (public) school board trustee in 1950, then as councillor for Ward 3 (Scarborough Village) and as deputy reeve. In 1957, Campbell became reeve of the township of Scarborough for the next 11 years. When the township was incorporated as a borough in 1967, he became its first mayor from 1967 until 1969.

On October 1, 1969, he was elected by the Metropolitan Toronto council to the position of chairman, defeating former North York reeve Norman C. Goodhead by 21 votes to 11 on the third ballot. He was re-elected to the position unanimously in January 1972 but, ill with cancer, he retired on July 30, 1973, and died shortly thereafter. During his career, he had also served as president of the Canadian Federation of Mayors and Municipalities, the Ontario Municipal Association, and the Association of Ontario Mayors and Reeves.

He attempted to enter provincial politics twice. He was defeated for the Ontario Liberal Party nomination for York—Scarborough prior to the 1959 provincial election to former reeve Oliver E. Crockford. Four years later, he won the Liberal nomination in Scarborough Centre but was defeated in the 1963 provincial election placing third.

Where Campbell's predecessors as Metro Chairman, Fred Gardiner and William Allen, had driven their agendas at Metro Council, Campbell saw himself more as Council's servant with the duty to implement the policies decided upon by the assembly.

Legacy
Albert Campbell Square at the Scarborough Civic Centre, the Albert Campbell District Library and a Scarborough high school, Albert Campbell Collegiate Institute, are named after him.

References
 School History – Albert Campbell CI
 

Chairmen of Metropolitan Toronto
1910 births
1973 deaths
People from Chatham-Kent
Mayors of Scarborough, Toronto
Ontario Agricultural College alumni